Christians in Sierra Leone constitute approximately 70.8% percent of the country's population as of 2013. Other sources report that the population of Christians in Sierra Leone may reach 64%. Christianity was brought to Sierra Leone by the Nova Scotian Settlers when they founded the Colony of Sierra Leone in March 1792. 

The Constitution provides for freedom of religion, and the Government generally respected this right in practice.

Intermarriage between Muslims and Christians is common. Islam and Christianity are often syncretized with indigenous religious beliefs.

Protestantism

The majority of Sierra Leonean Christians are Protestants, of which the largest are Methodists and Evangelicals.

Roman Catholicism

Catholics are the second-largest non-Protestant Christians division in Sierra Leone, at about 5% of the country's population.

References

 
Nova Scotian Settlers
Sierra Leone Creole people